Jharkhand Silk Textile and Handicraft Development Corporation (Jharcraft) is an agency of Government of Jharkhand  established in 2006 with the objective to develop and support Sericulture farmers, weavers and artisans of Jharkhand. The organization implements the government-funded schemes to promote tussar silk, handloom and handicraft of the state. The company is incorporated under Companies Act, 1956 to act as an implementing agency. Its area of concern is the handloom, handicraft, and sericulture sectors. The activities are based in the interior areas of the state and the organization works basically on the SHG, NGO and Project modules. Work-sheds are built within the villages with all necessary facilities for the artisans and weavers to work at the nearest place from their houses. Other facilities including training, raw materials, etc. are also provided to them in these work-sheds for uninterrupted work. These artisans are supervised by the master trainers and qualified cluster managers & project managers throughout. This is to check the quality standards of the commodities produced.

History 
In the year 2006, Jharcraft was started as an organisation to create new opportunities in rural areas with an objective to change lives throughout the state. In the first year, the organisation was engaged in organizing production units of various categories. Today, it provides both, forward and backward linkage to the Handloom and Handicrafts sectors for a sustainable source of livelihood. It was formed to provide aggressive marketing to the merchandise made by the rural artists.

Products of Jharcraft 
1. Dhokra art / 2. cloths of tussar silk / 3. tribal art work / 4. wood craft / 5. lac jewellery and bangles / 6. leather products / 7. Gonda grass items / 8. terracotta products / 9. cane and bamboo products / 10. musical instruments / 11. jute products

List of emporiums 
Jharkhand

1. Jharcraft Outlet, Annapurna Building, Kadru More, Ranchi 834001

2. Santosh Textile, Near Sidhu Kanhu High School, Thana Road Dumka-814101

3. Jharcraft Emporium, City Center, Dhanbad-826001

4. Urban Hatt, Near Home Guard Training Center, Hazaribagh

5. Santosh Textile, Urban Haat, Shilp Gram, Near Nandan Pahar, Deoghar

6. Birsa Munda Airport, Ranchi
 
Kolkata

1. 3D,Camac Street.Kolkata 700016. HP Petrol Pump (Camac Auto Service Pvt.Ltd.)

2. Jharcraft Emporium, HP Petrol Pump, NSC Bose Road, Narendrapur

3. Jharcraft Emporium, Hindustan Petrolium Corporation LTD, Debi Service Station 362, SNC BOSS Road, Naktala

Delhi

1. Shop No. 141, August karnti Bhawan, Bhikaji Cama Place, New Delhi-66

2. 23/c, Handlooms Marketing Complex, Janpath, New Delhi

Gujarat

1. First Floor, H.P.C.L. Petrol Pump, Mansi Circle, Vastrapur, Ahmadabad-380015, Gujarat

Maharashtra

1. Excel Service Station, VM road JVPD, Juhu, Mumbai 400056

Bengaluru

1. No 47, St, John Road, Near Commercial Street, Bengaluru 560042

Jharcraft has obtained Export-Import code and a successfully exporting to the foreign countries. Sweden, USA, UK, Germany, Sudan, Turkey, Saudi Arabia, China, Lithuania, Brazil, Cambodia, France & Greece are the major importers of the organisation. Jharcraft is only producer of Organic Tasar Silk across the globe and has added value to its product by obtaining "GOTS Certificate" from One Cert, USA. To substantiate the purity of the silk produce in the state we have also obtained "Silk Mark" from ‘Silk Mark Organisation of India’.

Awards and accolades 
The Institute of Economic Studies (IES), New Delhi, honoured both, Mr. Kumar and Jharcraft for their contribution to the industrial sector of the state as well as of the country. Mr. Kumar received the coveted Udyog Ratan award, while Jharcraft was presented a Certificate of Excellence in March 2014.

This accolade follows Jharkhand Times Impact Award, 2012, to honour individuals and organisations who contributed to the state's growth and well-being in which Jharcraft was awarded as the "Most admired State PSU".

See also
 Khadi
 Khādī Development and Village Industries Commission (Khadi Gramodyog)

References

External links
 official website

State agencies of Jharkhand
Culture of Jharkhand
2006 establishments in Jharkhand
State handicrafts development corporations of India
Silk in India
Handloom industry in India
Government agencies established in 2006